The Loving Kind is the fifth album from contemporary Christian music singer Cindy Morgan.  This concept album chronicles the eight days surrounding the crucifixion of Jesus Christ, as would a Passion play.

Track listing
All songs written by Cindy Morgan, except where noted.
 "In the Garden" - 2:42
 "The March" - 3:59
 "The Loving Kind" - 5:16
 "The Last Supper" - 3:15
 "Devil Man" - 3:23
 "Can You Hear Me" - 4:43
 "The Only Way" - 3:00
 "Hard Heart" (Morgan, Brent Bourgeois) - 3:27
 "The Whipping" - 1:34
 "Higher" (Morgan, Brent Lenthall) - 4:31
 "Take My Life" - 4:38
 "Alive and Well" (Morgan, Andrew Ramsey, Michael W. Smith) - 4:25
 "Praise the King" - 3:52

Personnel
 Cindy Morgan – lead vocals, backing vocals, choir vocals, acoustic piano
 Brent Bourgeois – keyboards, acoustic piano, Wurlitzer, programming, vibraphone, backing vocals, choir vocals
 Dennis Patton – keyboards, programming, loops, track arrangements
 Michael W. Smith – acoustic piano (12)
 Jerry McPherson – guitar 
 Wes King – guitar, backing vocals 
 Matt Slocum – guitar
 Brent Milligan – bass
 Larry Tagg – bass
 Aaron Smith – drums
 Raymond Boyd – percussion 
 Mark Douthit – saxophones, clarinet, horn arrangements
 David Davidson – violin 
 Tom Howard – string arrangements and conductor 
 The Nashville String Machine – strings
 Lyle Burbridge – backing vocals
 Craig Hansen – backing vocals
 Heather Payne – backing vocals
 Andrew Ramsey – backing vocals
 Nicol Sponberg – backing vocals, choir vocals
 Avalon – guest vocals 
 John Elefante – guest vocals 
 Brandon Conger – choir vocals
 Megan Dockery – choir vocals
 Katy Dunham – choir vocals
 Brandon Hargest – choir vocals
 Jody McBrayer – choir vocals
 Ashley Melling – choir vocals
 Allison Pierce – choir vocals
 Catherine Pierce – choir vocals
 Chris Rice – choir vocals
 Emily Webb – choir vocals
 Matthew White – choir vocals
 Derek Jones – voices
 Angie Magill – voices

Production
 Producer and A&R Direction – Brent Bourgeois
 Co-producer, Engineer and Mixing – Craig Hansen
 Production Assistant – Linda Bourne Wornell
 Assistant Engineers – Tim Coyle, Todd Gunnerson, Fred Paragano and Matt Weeks.
 Mastered by Ken Love at MasterMix (Nashville, TN).
 Art Direction – Beth Lee
 Design – Chuck Hargett 
 Photography – Chuck Hargett and Mark Smalling
 Hair Stylist and Makeup – Michelle Vanderpool

References

1998 albums
Cindy Morgan (singer) albums